The Pomona Natural Bridge is a natural bridge approximately 30m long, 3m wide, and 3m thick, located near Pomona, IL.  It is in the Shawnee National Forest. A small unnamed stream flows beneath the bridge.

References
 Sierra Club Page
 USDA - Forest Service Page

http://www.shawneeshuttle.com/Southern-Illinois-Attractions/State-Parks-Natural-Areas-Lakes/Pomona-Natural-Bridge.html

Landforms of Jackson County, Illinois
Protected areas of Jackson County, Illinois
Natural arches of Illinois
Shawnee National Forest
Articles containing video clips